Cottee's is an Australian food and beverage brand founded in 1927. Cottee's make a variety of products including cordial, jams, marmalades and other spreads, toppings, jellies and puddings. The company is owned by Kraft Heinz with its drinks manufactured under licence by Asahi Breweries.

History
The company was founded in the early 20th century by dairy farmer Spencer Milton Cottee (ca.1864 – 8 June 1944) from Lismore. Cottee was a champion of the dairy industry and began processing and marketing the milk by-product casein. He diversified into processing passionfruit into Passiona soft drink. A factory was opened in Leichhardt in the 1930s.  Passiona was also bottled in South Australia by Geo. Hall and Sons.

Apart from Passiona, the most popular Cottee's carbonated soft drinks were Tango (orange), and Coola (lime), with other flavours including lemon, cola, and lemonade. The brand's popularity reached its zenith in the 1960s. Cottee's Coola flavour is the most popular cordial in Australia (Coola, Australia's Flavourite Cordial).

In 1965, Cottee's was acquired by the American company General Foods and, in 1984, by Cadbury Schweppes. Schweppes Australia was acquired by Asahi Breweries in 2009.

See also
 Harold Warnock Cottee

Notes and references

External links
 Official Website

Australian brands
Ice cream brands
Drink companies of Australia
Food and drink companies established in 1927
Australian companies established in 1927
Asahi Breweries